Michael L. Jameson, Jr (born July 14, 1979) is a former American football cornerback who played three seasons in the National Football League (NFL). He was drafted in the sixth round of the 2001 NFL Draft by the Cleveland Browns after playing college football for Texas A&M University.

College career
Jameson played collegiately for the Texas A&M Aggies football team from 1997–2000. During his time with Texas A&M, he played all three positions in the secondary: cornerback, free safety and strong safety. He intercepted seven passes during his career, returning three for a touchdown. He also recorded 190 tackles. In 1999, as a junior, he was named second–team All–Big 12 Conference.

Professional career
The Cleveland Browns selected him in the sixth round of the 2001 NFL Draft and on May 25, they signed him to a three–year contract. After being drafted by the Browns, Jameson said about his playing style, "I try to strike first, right at the point of attack. I like to try and use quickness, instincts and athletic ability to deliver the first blow." In the Browns' final preseason game against the Washington Redskins, Jameson broke his leg. He was placed on injured reserve on August 28. The following season, during final cuts, he was waived from the team, only to be re-signed to the practice squad the next day. However, on October 10, he was signed to the active roster. He made his NFL debut on October 13 against the Tampa Bay Buccaneers, recording one tackle in the game. The following week, against the Houston Texans, he received more playing time than he had in his debut. He tallied five tackles and one sack in the game, earning a game ball for his performance. On November 3, he recorded a season–high six tackles against the Pittsburgh Steelers and on December 22, he intercepted his first pass in the NFL. After the season, he became an exclusive-rights free agent and eventually re-signed a $300,000 contract with Cleveland. During training camp, after Robert Griffith broke his finger, Jameson was listed as one of the Browns' two starting safeties. However, Griffith returned before the season began. In 2003, Jameson played in 15 games for the Browns, recording 14 tackles. His season–high in tackles came in week 15 of the season against the Denver Broncos. Jameson, in 2004, played in all 16 games and recorded a career–high 17 tackles. In week 16, against Miami, he recorded four tackles, while the following week, against the Houston Texans, he tallied five tackles. Entering the 2005 season, he was the final member of the Browns' 2001 draft class that still remained on the roster.  However, on September 3, he was suspended for four games for violating the league's substance–abuse policy. On October 14, after his suspension was lifted, he returned to practice with the Browns. The Browns terminated his contract on October 17.

References

1979 births
Living people
People from Killeen, Texas
Players of American football from Texas
American football cornerbacks
American football safeties
Texas A&M Aggies football players
Cleveland Browns players
American sportspeople in doping cases